The Edmonton Drillers were a North American Soccer League team that played both outdoors and indoors from 1979 to 1982, at the peak of the league's success. The team was brought to Edmonton by local entrepreneur and Edmonton Oilers owner Peter Pocklington, after witnessing the strong support for Brian Rice's Edmonton Black Gold team in 1978. Previous to playing in Edmonton, the team was known as the Oakland Stompers, Hartford Bicentennials and Connecticut Bicentennials.

History
Joe Petrone was the Drillers general manager for their entire existence. The Drillers were coached in 1979 and 1980 by Hans Kraay, who brought a number of players with him from the Netherlands. After Kraay, Timo Liekoski took over as coach in 1981, while Patrone would serve as the team's final caretaker coach until the team folded at the end of the 1982 season.

During the outdoor season, the Drillers played their home games at Commonwealth Stadium, but dwindling crowds during the final year saw the team move to much older and smaller Clarke Stadium, which led to even fewer fans attending the games. The Drillers played their two seasons of indoor soccer at Northlands Coliseum and also at Edmonton Gardens. The outdoor team was characterized by a strong defensive style of play, but their indoor style was built upon a run-and-go style of attack. Attendance for the outdoor games ranged greatly from 10,000 in the early stages of the franchise to 4,000 per game in 1982. By comparison, the more successful and profitable indoor games had attendances ranging between 5,000 and 7,000 paying fans per game in 1981 and 1982.

Because the Northlands Coliseum was booked, Game 1 of the 1981 NASL indoor finals was instead played at the slated-for-demolition Edmonton Gardens. On March 2, 1981 the Drillers defeated the Chicago Sting, 9–6, in front of 5,089 fans to lead the series.
In Game 2, played five days later, Edmonton came from behind to down the Sting, 5–4, in front of a then-record NASL indoor crowd of 16,257 at Chicago Stadium to sweep the finals and claim the 1981 NASL indoor championship.

Factors leading to collapse 
In 1982, costs were skyrocketing for the team as they were with a number of the other NASL franchises.  In Edmonton's case in particular, the following have been speculated as factors connected with the team's collapse: poor support by local media; difficulties stemming from a tricky deal with the owners of the Coliseum and Commonwealth Stadium relating to the attendance, concessions and parking at the indoor games; and as admitted by John Colbert, the Drillers' business manager in 1982, a business strategy that consisted a "top-down construction" for the team (i.e., bringing in expensive international players as opposed to developing cheaper local talent).

Year-by-year results

Honours
Championships (1)
 NASL indoor: 1980–81

Regular Season/ Division Titles (2)
 NASL: 1980
 NASL indoor: 1981–82

NASL All Stars
 1980: Peter Nogly -Second Team
 1981: Peter Nogly -First Team

NASL indoor MVP
 1980–81: Kai Haaskivi

NASL indoor Scoring Champion
 1980–81: Kai Haaskivi (co-champion)

NASL indoor Finals MVP
 1981–82: Kai Haaskivi

NASL indoor All Stars
 1980–81: Drew Ferguson, Kai Haaskivi
 1981–82: Jan Goossens, Kai Haaskivi

Canadian Soccer Hall of Fame
 Mike Sweeney: 2002
 Bruce Twamley: 2008

Indoor Soccer Hall of Fame 
 Kai Haaskivi: 2013
 Timo Liekoski: 2019

References

 
Association football clubs established in 1979
Association football clubs disestablished in 1982
Canadian indoor soccer teams
Defunct soccer clubs in Canada
North American Soccer League (1968–1984) teams
North American Soccer League (1968–1984) teams based in Canada
1979 establishments in Alberta
1982 disestablishments in Alberta
Soccer clubs in Edmonton

it:Edmonton Drillers#Edmonton Drillers (NASL 1975–1982)